Thomas Talbot and Rebecca Walton Smithers Stramcke House, also known as The Cedars, is a historic home located at Lexington, Lafayette County, Missouri.  It was built about 1887, and is a -story, asymmetrical, Queen Anne style frame dwelling.  It features a round three-story tower with a conical roof, a wraparound verandah with Eastlake movement supports and spindlework, and gable ornamentation.

It was listed on the National Register of Historic Places in 1999.

References

Houses on the National Register of Historic Places in Missouri
Queen Anne architecture in Missouri
Houses completed in 1887
Houses in Lafayette County, Missouri
National Register of Historic Places in Lafayette County, Missouri